María Hervás (born 1987) is a Spanish actress, best known for her performances in television series such as Los Serrano and La que se avecina, although she has rather received critical acclaim for her stage performances.

Biography 
Hervás was born in Madrid in 1987.

In 2007, Hervás landed her debut television role performing Susana in Los Serrano, whereas her debut in a feature film came with a performance in the 2015 comedy film Cómo sobrevivir a una despedida.

She adapted Gary Owen's monologue Iphigenia in Splott into Iphigenia en Vallecas. The play earned her critical acclaim, a Max Award and a Actors and Actresses Union Award. Other stage credits include Jauría, and Confesiones a Alá.

She hosted the ceremony of the 7th Feroz Awards in 2020.

Filmography 

Television

Film

Awards and nominations

References 

1987 births
21st-century Spanish actresses
Spanish stage actresses
Spanish television actresses
Spanish film actresses
Living people